Afters is a 1980 compilation album (LP only) by the English Canterbury scene rock band Hatfield and the North. Of the sixteen tracks, eleven are taken from the band's two studio albums Hatfield and the North and The Rotters' Club, three are live recordings, and the two remaining songs are the A- and B- sides of their 1974 single "Let's Eat (Real Soon)" / "Fitter Stoke Has a Bath".

Track listing 

Tracks 1 and 2 were released as the A- and B-sides respectively of a 1974 single released on Virgin Records. Tracks 3, 4, 5, 10, 11, 15 and 16 are songs from The Rotters' Club, tracks 6 to 9 inclusive are from Hatfield and the North, and tracks 12 to 14 inclusive are edited recordings of live performances in France, mixed by Peter Wade.

 "Let's Eat (Real Soon)" – 3:14
 "Fitter Stoke Has a Bath" – 4:33
 "Mumps [edited]" – 8:14
 "Share It" – 3:02
 "Lounging There Trying" – 3:15
 "The Stubbs Effect" – 0:23
 "Big Jobs (Poo Poo Extract)" – 0:45
 "Going Up to People and Tinkling" – 2:17
 "Calyx" – 2:46
 "(Big) John Wayne Socks Psychology on the Jaw" – 0:43
 "Chaos at the Greasy Spoon" – 0:23
 "Halfway Between Heaven and Earth" – 6:08
 "Oh, Len's Nature! [aka Nan True's Hole]" – 2:00
 "Lything and Gracing" – 3:48
 "Prenut" – 3:55
 "Your Majesty Is Like a Cream Donut (Loud)" – 1:37

Personnel 
Hatfield and the North
 Dave Stewart – keyboards
 Richard Sinclair – bass, vocals
 Phil Miller – guitar
 Pip Pyle – drums, noise
Additional musicians 
 Jimmy Hastings – flutes (2-15), saxophone (16)
 Lindsay Cooper – oboe, bassoon (10)
 Tim Hodgkinson – clarinet (10)
 Mont Campbell – French horn (10-11)
 Barbara Gaskin – backing vocals (2-3-15-16)
 Amanda Parsons – backing vocals (2-3-15-16)
 Ann Rosenthal – backing vocals (2-3-15-16)
 Robert Wyatt – voice (9)

References 

Hatfield and the North albums
1980 compilation albums
Virgin Records compilation albums